Transcranial stimulation may refer to:

Transcranial magnetic stimulation (TMS or rTMS or deep TMS)
Transcranial direct current stimulation (tDCS)
Transcranial alternating current stimulation (tACS)
Transcranial focused ultrasound stimulation (tFUS)
Cranial electrotherapy stimulation (CES), also called transcranial electrotherapy

See also
Electro stimulation (disambiguation)